Eddie Mukahanana born 9 March 1977 in Bulawayo, Zimbabwe is a Zimbabwean former footballer. He is the Owner and Technical Director of Westcastle International Academy and Head Coach of the Men's Premier Team in the Pacific Coast Soccer League.

Playing career

He was a member of the Zimbabwe national football team during the 1998 FIFA World Cup Qualifiers. He also received 14 youth national team caps playing on the U17 and U20 National teams during the COSAFA Youth Championships.

His professional career started with Highlanders FC and then moved to Zimbabwe Saints in the Zimbabwe Premier Soccer League making his debut at age of 17-year 2 months.

In the United States (1995–2000) he attended the University of Montevallo on a soccer scholarship, from where he would then travel every summer break to play for Zimbabwe Saints until 2000.

In the United States, Mukahanana played for the Central Coast Roadrunners (USL) in 1996 and 2001 Des Moines Menace (PDL).

Retirement in 2002 due to an injury.

After retirement from professional soccer, Mukahanana joined Victoria United at the end of 2002 season before finally turning to coaching full-time.

Coaching career
First discovered his passion for coaching at age 24, whilst still a professional player, he started his coaching career in the US coaching a High School Boys U16 team: "he instantly realized that once he stopped playing, the only thing he wanted was to go into coaching full-time". Following a serious ankle injury ended his professional playing career while playing in the USL, by then Eddie had already gained his National B License with the United States Soccer Federation (USSF) and his path into coaching was well and truly underway. He attained his UEFA A License in 2011.

He has coached Pacific Coast Soccer League Champions Victoria United Football Club and Victoria Stars Football Club in Canada, Bakersfield Warriors F.C in the USA and various youth club teams in Canada . Mukahanana was the Technical Director for Bays United Football Club from 2004-2021.

Club Ownership
Mukahanana founded Westcastle International Academy (WIA) in Victoria, BC Canada. WIA was founded in 2019 to create the optimum training environment to foster development and form talented young players into top football players. WIA's youth teams, U9-U18, play in the Lower Island Soccer League and the U23 Academic Pathway Residency Men's and Women's teams play in the Pacific Coast Soccer League and Vancouver Island Soccer League.

References
Best of the Best, Eddie Mukahanana 01.04.12 | The Zimbabwean
Where are they now? Eddie Mukahanana | The Zimbabwean March 2013
Former warrior gives back to community | The Zimbabwean April 2013
Zimbabwe FA to use foreign based coaches to recruit diaspora players | Zimbabwe Herald 11 July 2012 
Mukahanana eyes Young Warriors | NewsDay Zimbabwe Jan 17, 2011
Former Warrior to get UEFA license | The Zimbabwean Aug 24, 2010
Mukahanana named Victoria United Head Coach | Pacific Coast Soccer League Feb 1, 2007
Former Des Menace players in the Pros | Des Moines Manace FC 
Eddie Mukahanana Technical Director Bays United | Bays United FC

External links 
 Official Website
 Westcastle International Academy

Zimbabwean footballers
Des Moines Menace players
Central Coast Roadrunners players
Living people
1977 births
USL League Two players
Association football defenders
Highlanders F.C. players